The ITTF-Oceania Cup is an annual table tennis event held by the International Table Tennis Federation (ITTF). The event features men's and women's singles tournaments, with the winners qualifying for the table tennis World Cup.

Since 2011, the event has also included the Pacific Cup, a separate tournament which excludes players from Australia and New Zealand.

Champions

See also

Oceania Table Tennis Championships

References

External links

ITTF-Oceania

 
Table tennis competitions
Table tennis in Oceania
Oceanian international sports competitions
Recurring sporting events established in 2007
2007 establishments in Oceania